Out of Joint is a British and international touring theatre company based in London. It specialises in the commissioning and production of new writing, interspersed with occasional revivals and classic productions.

It was founded in 1993 by director Max Stafford-Clark and producer Sonia Friedman. Stafford-Clark left the company in 2017 and its current Artistic Director is Kate Wasserberg, who joined the company in April 2017. Graham Cowley succeeded Friedman as producer in 1998. Upon his retirement in 2012 he was succeeded as producer by Panda Cox, who originally joined the company as Stafford-Clark's assistant. The company's current Executive Producer is Martin Derbyshire.

The company has premiered plays by established writers such as David Edgar, Sebastian Barry, Richard Bean, Caryl Churchill, April De Angelis, David Hare, Rebecca Lenkiewicz, Mark Ravenhill and Timberlake Wertenbaker, as well as work from first-time writers such as Stella Feehily and  Mark Ravenhill. Classic productions include She Stoops to Conquer, Three Sisters and Macbeth. The company has performed on 6 continents and has co-produced with theatres such as The National Theatre, Royal Court Theatre, Bush Theatre, Hampstead Theatre and Sydney Theatre Company.

Productions

2019 The Remains of the Day based on the novel by Kazuo Ishiguro adapted by Barney Norris
2018 Close Quarters by Kate Bowen
2017 Rita, Sue and Bob Too by Andrea Dunbar 
2017 Consent by Nina Raine 
2016 A View from Islington North by Alistair Beaton, Caryl Churchill, Stella Feehily, David Hare and Mark Ravenhill
2015 All That Fall by Samuel Beckett
2015 Jane Wenham: The Witch of Walkern by Rebecca Lenkiewicz
2015 Crouch, Touch, Pause, Engage by Robin Soans
2014 Pitcairn by Richard Bean
2014 This May Hurt A Bit by Stella Feehily
2013 Ciphers by Dawn King
2012 Fear Of Music by Barney Norris
2012 Our Country's Good by Timberlake Wertenbaker
2011 Bang Bang Bang by Stella Feehily
2011 Top Girls by Caryl Churchill
2011 A Dish of Tea with Dr Johnson adapted by Russell Barr, Ian Redford and Max Stafford-Clark from James Boswell's The Life of Samuel Johnson and The Journal of a Tour to the Hebrides.
2010 The Big Fellah by Richard Bean
2010 Andersen's English by Sebastian Barry
2009 Mixed Up North by Robin Soans
2009 Dreams of Violence by Stella Feehily
2008 The Convict's Opera by Stephen Jeffreys
2008 Testing the Echo by David Edgar
2007 Flight Path by David Watson
2007 King of Hearts by Alistair Beaton
2006 The Overwhelming by J. T. Rogers
2006 O go my Man by Stella Feehily
2005 Talking to Terrorists by Robin Soans
2004 Sisters, Such Devoted Sisters by Russell Barr
2004 Macbeth by William Shakespeare
2003 Duck by Stella Feehily
2003 The Permanent Way by David Hare
2002 She Stoops to Conquer by Oliver Goldsmith and A Laughing Matter by April De Angelis
2002 Hinterland by Sebastian Barry
2001 Sliding with Suzanne by Judy Upton
2001 Feelgood by Alistair Beaton
2000 Rita, Sue and Bob Too by Andrea Dunbar and A State Affair by Robin Soans
1999 Some Explicit Polaroids by Mark Ravenhill
1999 Drummers by Simon Bennett
1998 Our Country's Good by Timberlake Wertenbaker
1998 Our Lady of Sligo by Sebastian Barry
1997 Blue Heart by Caryl Churchill
1998 The Positive Hour by April De Angelis
1996 Shopping and Fucking by Mark Ravenhill
1995 The Steward of Christendom by Sebastian Barry
1995 Three Sisters by Anton Chekhov and The Break of Day by Timberlake Wertenbaker
1994 The Man of Mode by George Etherege and The Libertine by Stephen Jeffreys
1994 The Queen and I by Sue Townsend and Road by Jim Cartwright

References

Stafford-Clark, M. and Roberts, P. (2007) Taking Stock: The Theatre of Max Stafford-Clark, London: Nick Hern Books,

External reference

Out Of Joint website
British Council Out Of Sight profile

Theatre companies in the United Kingdom
Theatre companies in London